Flynn Andrew Ogilvie (born 17 September 1993) is an Australian field hockey player, and Commonwealth Games gold medallist.

Personal life
Ogilvie was born in Wollongong, New South Wales.

Career

Junior National Teams
Ogilvie first represented Australia in 2010, at the Youth Olympic Games in Singapore. This was the first edition of field hockey at the Summer Youth Olympics, with Australia winning the inaugural gold medal.

In 2013, Ogilvie again represented Australia at junior level on three occasions. At the 2013 Australian Youth Olympic Festival, Ogilvie was a member of the gold medal winning Australia team in the men's competition.

At the 2013 Junior Oceania Cup, Australia won gold, qualifying for the Junior World Cup. At the Junior World Cup, Ogilvie again represented the Australia Under 21's, helping the team to a 5th-place finish.

Senior National Team
Ogilvie made his senior international debut in 2014, in a test series against India in Perth, Australia.

Since his debut, Ogilvie has become a regular inclusion in the Australian team.

Most notably, Ogilvie was a member of the Gold Medal winning Australia team at the 2018 Commonwealth Games. This marked a record 6th title for the Australian team, winning in every edition of Hockey at the Commonwealth Games.

Ogilvie was selected in the Kookaburras Olympics squad for the Tokyo 2020 Olympics. The team reached the final for the first time since 2004 but couldn't achieve gold, beaten by Belgium in a shootout.

References

External links
 
 
 

1993 births
Living people
Australian male field hockey players
Male field hockey midfielders
Sportspeople from Wollongong
Field hockey players at the 2010 Summer Youth Olympics
Field hockey players at the 2018 Commonwealth Games
Field hockey players at the 2022 Commonwealth Games
2018 Men's Hockey World Cup players
Commonwealth Games medallists in field hockey
Commonwealth Games gold medallists for Australia
Youth Olympic gold medalists for Australia
Field hockey players at the 2020 Summer Olympics
Olympic field hockey players of Australia
Olympic silver medalists for Australia
Medalists at the 2020 Summer Olympics
Olympic medalists in field hockey
20th-century Australian people
21st-century Australian people
Sportsmen from New South Wales
2023 Men's FIH Hockey World Cup players
Medallists at the 2018 Commonwealth Games
Medallists at the 2022 Commonwealth Games